Douglas Scott Falconer  (10 March 1913 in Oldmeldrum, Aberdeenshire – 23 February 2004 in Edinburgh) was a Scottish geneticist known for his work in quantitative genetics. Falconer's book Introduction to quantitative genetics was written in 1960 and became a valuable reference for generations of scientists. Its latest edition dates back to 1996 and is coauthored by Trudy Mackay.

Falconer graduated with first class honors in zoology from the University of St Andrews in 1940. He then received his PhD from the University of Cambridge in 1943. He eventually got an honorary ScD from Cambridge in 1969.

In 1951, Falconer described a novel mouse mutant that he called reeler for its peculiar gait. Later research using these mice has led to the discovery of reelin, a protein playing important roles in corticogenesis, neuronal migration, and plasticity.

In 1964, he introduced the use of liability threshold models into human disease & trait modeling.

In 1973, he was announced as a Fellow of the Royal Society (FRS).

See also 
 Falconer's formula

References 

1913 births
2004 deaths
Alumni of the University of St Andrews
Alumni of King's College, Cambridge
Scottish geneticists
Fellows of the Royal Society
Fellows of the Royal Society of Edinburgh
People from Aberdeenshire
Academics of the University of Edinburgh
Genetic epidemiologists